Kunjaliyan ( is a 2012 Indian Malayalam-language Comedy film directed by Saji Surendran and written by Krishna Poojappura. The film features Jayasurya in the title role along with Ananya in lead roles, and Suraj Venjaramoodu, Manikuttan, Vijayaraghavan, Ashokan, Jagadish, Maniyanpilla Raju in its supporting cast. The songs are composed by M.G. Sreekumar and background score by Bijibal.

Plot
Jayaraman is popularly known as Kunjaliyan (Young Brother-in-law) in Gopalapuram, a village in the Kerala–Tamil Nadu border. He is the younger brother of three sisters. The sisters were caring him as their own child since the death of their father and mother. Jayaraman was the pet of his sisters and he was not interested in to do any job. He is lazy. Everything was perfect until the sisters got married. The brothers-in-law were not interested in Jayaraman at all and they were not considered him as their younger brother. One day he left Gopalapuram to become a millionaire. Somehow he reached Dubai after years and he managed to get a job there. Unfortunately he got terminated from his job due to the due global recession. He is forced to go back to Gopalapuram and he is not interested in returning to his village without being a millionaire.

Now Jayaraman is returning to his village considering the advice of Mr. Preman, his best friend in Dubai. But Jayaraman is shocked to see the warm welcome by his family members at the airport. Everyone is trying to take their young brother-in-law to their home. Why are they showing this much interest in him now than before? That question is what remains to be.

Cast
 Jayasurya as Jayaraman / Kunjaliyan
 Ananya as Maya, Jayaraman's love interest
 Suraj Venjaramoodu as Preman, Jayaraman's best friend from Dubai, who is with him throughout various comical incidents.
Manikuttan as Vinayan, a town rowdy
 Maniyan Pilla Raju as Vikrama Kurup, Jayaraman's uncle with two wives.
 Vijayaraghavan as Remanan, Jayaraman's brother-in-law.
 Jagadish as Sukumaran, Jayaraman's brother-in-law 
 Ashokan as Viswan, Jayaraman's brother-in-law.
 Bindu Panicker as Shyamala, Jayaraman's elder sister, who is married to Remanan.
 Geetha Vijayan as Mallika, who is married to Vikrama Kurup along with Kanakabaram.
 Harisree Ashokan as Veeramanikandan, a humorous politician and the Panchayath President of the Gopalapuram City.
 Thesni Khan as Prameela,Jayaraman's sister   married to Viswan.
Narayanankutty
 Reshmi Boban as Pushpaletha, Jayaraman's sister who is married to Sukumaran.
 Kalaranjini as Kanakabaram, Vikrama Kurup's wife.
 Anand as Suresh Varma, a negative character.
 Leena as Manjari

Production
The film is Surendran's fourth, and comes after Four Friends, which met a mixed reception. The film's script was written by Krishna Poojappura. Anil Nair is the film's cinematographer, and the music is written by M. G. Sreekumar. Shooting began in late September 2011, in Pollachi depicting the fictional town called Gopalapurram. The film was produced by Tomichan Mulakuppadam under the company Mulakuppadam Films, with a budget of 3.25 crore.

Box Office
The film become flopp at the box office.

Soundtrack

Kunjaliyan soundtrack is composed by M. G. Sreekumar and background score by Bijibal, recording of the songs where in late August. Song Mixing done by Renjith Viswanathan.

References

External links
 KUNJALIYAN Official Website 
 Young SuperStar Jayasurya in & as 'Kunjaliyan'
 Jayasurya in & as Kunjaliyan(Popcorn.oneindia.in)
 Jayasurya in Saji's 'Kunjaliyan'
 Jayasurya in & as Kunjaliyan (Metromatinee.com)
 Ananya pairing with Jayasurya in Kunjaliyan
 Jayasurya is Kunjaliyan
 Saji Surendran's new film Kunjaliyan
 Kunjaliyan(Sulekha.com)

2010s Malayalam-language films
Indian satirical films
Films shot in Pollachi
Films directed by Saji Surendran